Sunaina - Mera Sapna Sach Hua (English: Sunaina - My dream became reality) or simply known as Sunaina is an Indian television series aired on Pogo channel. The show revolves around a 13-year-old girl Sunaina who has an ability to see the future in her dreams and follows the misadventures by those dreams.

Cast 
Palak Jain as Sunaina V. Mathur
Umang Jain as Nina Kuteer
Jayshree Soni as Ritika Bhattacharya
Devansh Doshi as Sohail Shaikh
Mridula Sathe as Swagatika
Kalika Vatnani as Ms. Malpekar
Kaustubh Thakare as Rohan
Lalit Parimoo as Principal Shastri
Pragati Mehra as Geethika V. Mathur
Nitesh Pandey as Vijay Mathur
Markand Soni as Rishabh V. Mathur

Episodes 

Episodes of 'Sunaina' started airing on Pogo Channel on 25 May 2008 with the episode "Stay Away From Rohan!". The show ended with the airing of "Get Ms. Malphatia Out!" on 26 October 2008.

References

External links
 
Official Sunaina Website

Indian comedy television series
Television series set in the 2000s
Television about magic
Science fantasy television series
2008 Indian television series debuts
2008 Indian television series endings
Pogo (TV channel) original programming
Indian teen sitcoms
Hindi language television sitcoms
Television series about teenagers